Wheatland is a historic plantation home located near Loretto, Essex County, Virginia. It was built between 1849 and 1851, and is a two-story, five-bay, frame dwelling with a hipped roof in the Greek Revival style. It has a double-pile central hall plan, and features two-story porches on the principal facades.  A simple one-story gable-roofed frame wing contains a kitchen. The property includes a contributing wharf (1916), smokehouse and kitchen.

It was listed on the National Register of Historic Places in 1990.

References

Houses on the National Register of Historic Places in Virginia
Greek Revival houses in Virginia
Houses completed in 1851
Houses in Essex County, Virginia
National Register of Historic Places in Essex County, Virginia
1851 establishments in Virginia